The National Highschool of DME "Asunción Escalada" (commonly called by the acronym CNAE) (and formerly known as the National School of Girls) is a traditional secondary school, located in the city of Asunción, Paraguay. It was created by a Decree on February 10, 1938, as one of the few educational institutions of that time in charge of education exclusively for girls.

It kept its gender distinction until 2004, when by a resolution, the Minister of Education ordered the school will become mixed, as is maintained until today.
The CNAE currently attend over a thousand students, in levels of basic education and medium level, with three modes of scientists baccalaureates and four technicians ones.

The school took a big jump in 2008, enabling the Technical Baccalaureate in Industrial Chemistry, making it one of only five schools in imparting this teaching in the Metropolitan Area.

In 2012 the institution was in charge of organizing the ESI-AMLAT science fair, which attracted young Scientists from around the world to Paraguay in order to share their knowledge in various branches of the science.

History 
On February 10, 1938, the Paraguayan government promulgated the decree No. 4,369 which created the "National Highschool for Girls". This decree is signed by the then President Dr. Félix Paiva.

In a paragraph of the decree justified the need to stimulate the formation of young women considering: "That the demands of modern society, the progress of industrial civilization under the leadership of new economic conditions (...) are essential to facilitate women the means to not be defeated in the struggle for life that she undertakes with the same tenacity that men do it... "

Mixed Highschool
The February 9, 2004 by Resolution No. 43, the Minister of Education and Culture, the Dr. Blanca Ovelar de Duarte permits the registration of men in the new National Highschool of DME called "Asunción Escalada". And so, after 66 years of teaching exclusively to the female population, the school took its original way: educate men and women on equal opportunities.
This decision brought with it multiple positions on one side were those who applauded the integration process, although some parents repudiated the action and pulled their daughters from the School.

Location 

The National Highschool for Girls opened in the building that is located at the intersection of streets Iturbe and Fulgencio R. Moreno, where he worked from 1938 to 1952, when he went to take out the current local place, that also was the building of the Colegio Nacional de la Capital.
On February 17, 1992, Dr. Horacio Galeano Perrone, said the National Highschool for Girls are the only owner of its current site, located in the streets Iturbe and Eligio Ayala, where it is today.
In the grounds of the school is a multipurpose room named "Emilio Biggi" domain which has long been in dispute between the Institution and the Ministry of Education.

Anthem
On the initiative of the first principal of the institution Professor Wil Carísimo Avalos was created the Anthem of the National Highschool for Girls. The original letter was written by the "Poet of the City" Mr. Francisco Ortiz Méndez and the music belongs to the famous composer Mr. Remberto Giménez.

That anthem is not officially used since 2004, because the letter makes reference only to the education of women.

Present Day
Currently has a significant number of students in the morning and afternoon, are implemented Baccalaureates: Science with emphasis in Basic Sciences, Social Sciences and Arts and Letters, and Technicians in Business Administration, Accounting, Computer Science and Industrial Chemistry.

Uniform

The school uniform is obligatory in all courses. For boys is composed by a dark blue pants, a white shirt and dark blue tie, so for the girls, they use dark blue skirt, white shirt, dark blue tie and white stockings.
Typically is allowed the use of the shirts with the design of the Sports and Cultural Fair, which are performed each year, and a team whose colors represent the same. These are: red, yellow, blue, gray, white, turquoise, black, green and violet.

Principals List

Sport and scientific Activities

The CNAE performs several activities that promote the sport, and science fairs that attract the attention of all students.
Sports and Cultural Fair: Students and professors form teams represented with a color (red, yellow, blue, gray, white, turquoise, black, green or purple) among several competing courses with categories such as Football (Soccer), volleyball, basketball, handball, athletics, swimming, cycling, chess, Fair of Knowledge, safari, etc. It highlights the issue of 2013 for having captured the interest of teachers and students alike, as well as the high turnout.
Expoferia: It is usually performed at the end of each school year. Students specialties Computing and Industrial Chemistry exhibit their progress in science and technology projects respectively.
Ciencap: exhibition where are presented several projects done by students of topics of sciences and technology.
Gymnastic Show: activity that was popular years ago, but lately has been leaving out mainly due to the shortage of time.

References

External links
 Official Site
 Ministry of Education and Culture of Paraguay

Schools in Paraguay